Oval is an electronic music group founded in Germany in 1991 by Markus Popp, Sebastian Oschatz, Frank Metzger and Holger Lindmüller. The group pioneered glitch music, writing on CDs to damage them and produce music with the resulting fragments. The project has been a solo venture by Popp since the departure of other members in 1995.

History 
Oval was founded in 1991 by Markus Popp, Sebastian Oschatz, Frank Metzger, and Holger Lindmüller. Disdaining the use of synthesizers, Oval instead deliberately mutilated CDs by writing on them with felt pens, then processed samples of fragmented sounds to create a very rhythmic electronic style. 

Holger Lindmüller left about 1993, and Oval became a trio at that time. Oschatz and Metzger left the group in 1995, with Popp continuing under the Oval name. After a series of releases on Thrill Jockey and Form & Function in the late 1990s and early 2000s Oval was on hiatus until 2010, when the EP Oh was released. The first Oval album in almost a decade, titled O, was released later the same year, on Thrill Jockey. In March 2013, Oval released a sixteen-track album titled Calidostópia!, a project was funded by the Goethe Institute and the Cultural Foundation of the State of Bahia. Later that same year he released VOA (2013), an album that also emerged from the collaboration with singers and musicians from South America.

In 2016, Popp started his own label, UOVOOO. Its first release was French artist Mei's twelve-track album Partura and the second being Oval's eleven-track album Popp.

Other works 
Markus Popp was an integral part of the creation of Gastr Del Sol's 1998 album Camoufleur. In 2003 his collaboration with  Japanese singer Eriko Toyoda, entitled So, was released on Thrill Jockey. He also composed the soundtrack for a short film Retina.

Frank Metzger released some singles with Mego and the Internet label Falsch, and  started a collaboration with Rossano Polidoro and Emiliano Romanelli from "TU M'" in 2003 called Steno. Sebastian Oschatz is an interaction designer with Meso, a German media design collective.

In 2001 Björk sampled the track "Aero Deck" (from the 1994 album Systemisch) on her Vespertine album.

Awards
2015 QWARTZ Award "Lifetime Achievement Award"
2013 QWARTZ Award "Best Experimental Music"
2011 Prix Ars Electronica Honorable Mention
2001 Prix Ars Electronica Award of Distinction

Discography

Albums
 Wohnton (Ata Tak/1993)
 Systemisch (Mille Plateaux/1994)
 94 Diskont (Mille Plateaux/1995)
 Dok (Thrill Jockey/1998)
 Szenariodisk (Thrill Jockey/1999)
 Ovalprocess (Form and Function/2000)
 Pre/Commers (Thrill Jockey/2001)
 Ovalcommers (Form and Function/2001)
 Oh (Thrill Jockey/2010)
 O (Thrill Jockey/2010)
 OvalDNA (Shitkatapult/2011)
 Calidostópia! (Goethe Institute/2013)
 Voa (2013)
 Popp (UOVOOO/2016)
 Eksploio (UOVOOO/2019)
 Scis (UOVOOO/2020)
 Ovidono (UOVOOO/2022)

Compilation albums 
 I Said No Doctors! (2017, Dymaxion Groove)

See also
Electronic music
Acoustic ecology
Noise Music
List of noise musicians
Chip music
Circuit bending
Dark ambient
Sonic artifact
No-Fi

References

External links
Markus Popp Interview by Marc Weidenbaum, Disquiet, 1997
Markus Popp Interview by Sam Inglis, Sound on Sound, 2002
Markus Popp Interview by David Sullivan, Cyclic Defrost, 2016
Markus Popp account on Twitter
Oval discography at Discogs
Oval profile at Bandcamp

German musical groups
German electronic musicians
Musical groups established in 1991
1991 establishments in Germany